Khurkhul is a village in the Imphal West district in Manipur, India. Khurkhul's pin code is 795002 and the postal head office is in Mantripukhri.

Khurkhul has a total population of 6,450 people. There are about 1,344 houses in Khurkhul village.

References

Villages in Imphal West district